El Candidato may refer to:

 The Candidate (1959 film), Argentine drama film
 El Candidato (1978 film) Colombian comedy in List of Colombian films
 El candidato (1999 telenovela), Mexican telenovela in List of TV Azteca telenovelas and series
 El Candidato (2016 film), Peruvian political comedy satire film
 El Candidato (TV series), 2020 Mexican political thriller web television series